× Rodricidium, abbreviated as Rdcm. in the horticultural trade, is the nothogenus comprising intergeneric hybrids of the two orchid genera Oncidium and Rodriguezia (Onc. × Rdza.).

References

Orchid nothogenera
Oncidiinae